HERACLES (Human-Enhanced Robotic Architecture and Capability for Lunar Exploration and Science) is a planned robotic transport system to and from the Moon by Europe (ESA), Japan (JAXA) and Canada (CSA) that will feature a lander called the European Large Logistic Lander (EL3, or Argonaut), a Lunar Ascent Element, and a rover. The lander can be configured for different operations such as up to 1.5 tons of cargo delivery, sample-returns, or prospecting resources found on the Moon.

The system is planned to support the Artemis program and perform lunar exploration using the Lunar Gateway space station as a staging point.

Project overview

The HERACLES architecture was outlined by 2015.
ESA approved the HERACLES project in November 2019. Its first mission is expected to launch in 2030. The project will be the next phase of ESA's European Exploration Envelope Programme (E3P).

The HERACLES transport system will leverage the Lunar Gateway as a staging point. The architecture involves dispatching the EL3 lunar lander from Earth aboard an Ariane 64 which would land on the Moon with a disposable descent module.

The rover would then traverse several kilometers across the Schrödinger basin on the far side of the Moon to explore and collect more samples to load on the next EL3 lander. The ascent module would return each time to the Lunar Gateway, where it would be captured by the Canadian robotic arm and samples transferred to an Orion spacecraft for transport to Earth with the returning astronauts. The ascent module would then be refueled and paired with a new descent module dispatched from Earth.

The second and third landings would each have  payload available for alternate uses such as testing new hardware, demonstrating technology and gaining experience in operations.  The 4th or 5th lander mission will provide a sample return.

The project will require the development of a reusable lunar ascent engine, four of which could be clustered to power a reusable crewed or robotic lander in the future. Later missions will include a pressurised rover driven by astronauts and an ascent module for the crew to return to Earth.

Key objectives

The key objectives of HERACLES include: 
Preparing for human lunar missions by implementing, demonstrating, and certifying technology elements for human lunar landing, surface operations, and return.
Create opportunities for science, particularly sample return.
Gain scientific and exploration knowledge, particularly on potential resources.
Create opportunities to demonstrate and test technologies and operational procedures for future Mars missions.

System elements

The HERACLES EL3 lander concept will consist of the Lunar Descent Element (LDE), which will be provided by Japan's JAXA, the ESA-built Interface Element that will house the rover, and
the European Lunar Ascent Element (LAE) that will return the samples to the Lunar Gateway.

The total spacecraft mass will be ≈ including fuel, with a payload of ≈.

Reusable ascent engine development
Nammo have been awarded a contract to evaluate engine performance requirements and 'find' the best engine design. The engine may be fed by electrically driven pumps, from low pressure propellant tanks, which may enable in-space refueling.

See also

References

External links
Short video of the HERACLES transport system at YouTube.

2020s in spaceflight
Artemis program
Exploration of the Moon
Projects established in 2019
European Space Agency
European space programmes
European Space Agency space probes
Japanese space probes
Space program of Japan